Exodus to Jazz is the debut album by American jazz saxophonist Eddie Harris recorded in 1961 and released on the Vee-Jay label.

Reception 
The Allmusic review states "Exodus to Jazz is full of concise, easy-swinging grooves that maintain the appealing quality of the strikingly reimagined title track (particularly Harris' four originals). Far removed from his later, funkier days, Harris plays a cool-toned tenor who owes his biggest debt to Stan Getz's bop recordings, though there are touches of soul-jazz as well... Exodus to Jazz paved the way for numerous other crossover successes during the '60s (many in the soul-jazz realm), and while that may not be a credibility-boosting trend to start, the music still speaks for itself".

Track listing 
All compositions by Eddie Harris except as indicated
 "Exodus" (Ernest Gold) - 6:38
 "Alicia" - 3:39
 "Gone Home" - 2:53
 "A.T.C." - 5:31
 "A.M. Blues" (Willie Pickens) - 2:45
 "Little Girl Blue" (Lorenz Hart, Richard Rodgers) - 3:21
 "Velocity" - 5:08
 "W.P." (Pickens) - 4:31

Personnel 
 Eddie Harris - tenor saxophone
 Willie Pickens - piano
 Joe Diorio - guitar
 Bill Yancey - bass
 Harold Jones - drums
 Barbara Gardner - liner notes

References 

Eddie Harris albums
1961 albums
Vee-Jay Records albums